The 1989 World Men's Curling Championship was held at the Milwaukee Auditorium in Milwaukee, Wisconsin from April 3–9, 1989.

Teams

Round-robin standings

Round-robin results

Draw 1

Draw 2

Draw 3

Draw 4

Draw 5

Draw 6

Draw 7

Draw 8

Draw 9

Tiebreakers

Playoffs

Semifinals

Finals

References

World Men's Curling Championship
Curling
World Mens Curling Championship, 1989
Sports competitions in Milwaukee
1980s in Milwaukee
International curling competitions hosted by the United States
April 1989 sports events in the United States
Curling in Wisconsin